Hem Karna Poudel (Nepali: हेम कर्ण पौडेल) is Nepalese politician, belonging to Nepali Congress Party. Poudel is the current mayor of Itahari Sub-Metropolitan City. He  defeated CPN (Unified Marxist–Leninist) candidate Yam Kumar Chungbang Subba by receiving 33,049 votes.

Electoral History

2022 Itahari municipal election

References 

Living people
People from Sunsari District
Mayors of places in Nepal
Nepalese activists
21st-century Nepalese politicians
Year of birth missing (living people)